Attorney General Fleming may refer to:

Francis Fleming (1842–1922), Attorney General of Ceylon
Ted Flemming (politician) (born 1954), Attorney General of New Brunswick
Valentine Fleming (judge) (1809–1884), Attorney-General of Tasmania

See also
General Fleming (disambiguation)